Elmer Roland "Rollie" Miles (February 16, 1927 – August 17, 1995) was a professional football player for the Canadian Football League Edmonton Eskimos.  Miles played offence (running back), defence (linebacker, defensive back), and special teams (kickoff/punt returner, punter), during his eleven-year career with the Eskimos.  Miles is a member of the Canadian Football Hall of Fame, the Alberta Sports Hall of Fame, and the Edmonton Eskimos Wall of Honour. In November 2006, Miles was voted one of the CFL's Top 50 players (#48) of the league's modern era by Canadian sports network TSN.

Early life and college career
Miles was born in Washington, D.C. and attended college at St. Augustine's College in Raleigh, North Carolina.  At St. Augustine's, Miles excelled in baseball, football and track and field.

Miles initially left the United States for Canada to play baseball in Regina, Saskatchewan, but was convinced by the famed Annis Stukus to play football for the Edmonton Eskimos. He would continue to play semi-professional baseball in Canada during his CFL career.

Professional football career
Miles was one of the most versatile players in history of the CFL during his eleven-year (1951–1961) career with the Edmonton Eskimos. As a defensive player (linebacker and defensive back), Miles intercepted 38 passes for 547 yards.  As a special teams player, Miles returned punts (finishing with 279 punt returns for 2,085 yards) and kickoffs (88 returns for 2,131 yards), and punted on occasion. On offence, Miles was often found in a backfield with such CFL greats as Jackie Parker, Normie Kwong, Johnny Bright, Bernie Faloney and Don Getty, he could run or pass on the option with skill.

Selected as a CFL Western Conference All-Star eight times (three at running back, three at defensive back, two at linebacker) Miles was also named the Eskimos' team Most Valuable Player three times.

Miles played in five CFL Grey Cup championship games, winning three during the Eskimos' dynasty of successive Grey Cup titles in 1954, 1955, and 1956. Miles played in the famous 1954 Grey Cup game with separated ribs, but still helped his underdog team win that classic game.

Miles was inducted into the Canadian Football Hall of Fame and the Alberta Sports Hall of Fame in 1980.  The Eskimos added Miles' No. 18 jersey to its Wall of Honour in 1983. The City of Edmonton named the Rollie Miles Athletic Field in his honor.

Career regular season statistics

Later life and death
Miles received his Bachelor of Arts degree from the University of Alberta in 1956, and began work in the off season with the Edmonton Catholic School Board, where he taught school and organized high school sports.  Miles continued working with the Edmonton Catholic School Board upon his retirement from the CFL in 1961.

Miles and his wife, Dr. Marianne Miles, had seven children: Craig "Tony" Miles, Rolanda Miles, Michelle Miles, Monica Lipscombe, Rollie Miles, Jr. (lineman on the University of Alberta Golden Bears 1980 Vanier Cup national championship football team, and Most Valuable Player of the 1980 Churchill Bowl), Brett Miles (noted singer, songwriter and saxophonist), and Mario Miles (co-founder of the Millwood Grizzlies Minor Football Association in Edmonton in 1996, and coach from 1996 to present).

Miles was the grandfather of actor Jesse Lipscombe.

Miles died in 1995 in Edmonton.

References

1927 births
1995 deaths
American emigrants to Canada
American players of Canadian football
Canadian football defensive backs
Canadian football linebackers
Canadian football punters
Canadian football return specialists
Canadian football running backs
Edmonton Elks players
St. Augustine's Falcons football players
St. Augustine's Falcons baseball players
College men's track and field athletes in the United States
Canadian Football Hall of Fame inductees
University of Alberta alumni
Players of American football from Washington, D.C.
African-American players of Canadian football
Black Canadian players of Canadian football
20th-century African-American sportspeople